The Gautier Benitez High School, a school named after Puerto Rican poet José Gautier Benítez, was built in 1924 in Caguas, Puerto Rico and is listed on the U.S. National Register of Historic Places.

It is a U-shaped, two-story concrete structure with Classical Revival elements including monumental portico with triangular pediment and use of columns.

It was deemed significant for NRHP registration because it was the first high school in its area, and for its architecture.  Its neo-classical style reflects Americanization of public education since the 1898 transition of Puerto Rico.  It was built in a program along with the Ponce High School in Ponce and the Central High School in San Juan, both also NRHP-listed.

References

School buildings on the National Register of Historic Places in Puerto Rico
Neoclassical architecture in Puerto Rico
School buildings completed in 1924
1924 establishments in Puerto Rico
Caguas, Puerto Rico